Scoffin is a surname. Notable people with the surname include: 

Thomas Scoffin (born 1994), Canadian curler 
William Scoffin (1654/1655–1732), English Presbyterian minister